Choi Hung Estate is a public housing estate in Ngau Chi Wan, Kowloon, Hong Kong. It was built by the former Hong Kong Housing Authority and is now managed by the current Hong Kong Housing Authority. It received a Silver Medal at the 1965 Hong Kong Institute of Architects Annual Awards.

Location
Choi Hung Estate is located in Ngau Chi Wan and is surrounded by several of eastern Kowloon Peninsula's major roads. To the north is Lung Cheung Road; to the south Prince Edward Road East; to the west Kwun Tong Bypass and to the east Clear Water Bay Road.

History

The Hong Kong government granted the land to the Hong Kong Housing Authority to build a large housing estate in 1958. The blocks of the estate were completed between 1962 and 1964. An opening ceremony was held in 1963 with the presence of then Hong Kong Governor, Sir Robert Brown Black. A signboard commemorating the ceremony is located in the estate's Lam Chung Avenue.

Accommodating nearly 43,000 people, it was the largest public housing estate at the time. It subsequently attracted several prominent visitors, including Richard Nixon in 1964 (who became President of the United States in 1969), Britain's Princess Margaret in 1966, and Princess Alexandra in 1967.

Buildings and facilities
The estate has 11 residential blocks, one car park, and five schools, with various shops and restaurants on the ground floor of each block. Roads in the estate connect the blocks to each other and to major roads.

Residential blocks

Public facilities
car park
post office
bus terminus
2 markets

Demographics
According to the 2016 by-census, Choi Hung Estate had a population of 18,435. The median age was 48 and the majority of residents (96 per cent) were of Chinese ethnicity. Cantonese was the predominant usual spoken language (93 per cent), followed by other varieties of Chinese excluding Mandarin (4.5 per cent), non-English and non-Chinese languages (2 per cent), Mandarin (0.5 per cent), and English (0.3 per cent).

The average household comprised 2.5 persons. The median monthly household income of all households (i.e. including both economically active and inactive households) was HK$15,290.

Photography 

The estate is photogenic and has become a tourism hot-spot. The most photographed view of the estate includes the basketball court and rainbow apartments behind. Some journalists and researchers have been vocal against the growing Instagram popularity of the area, criticising that it is a shallow view of the complex social history of the council estate in Hong Kong, as well as driving away locals who want to use the space. Though some locals have also begun selling photos for profit to tourists. It has been suggested that the location is popular not only for the aesthetics, but also because it allows the photographers and selfie-takers to feel as if they are in the middle of the world - compared to the more detached equally-aesthetic Hong Kong skyline shots. In 2017, a photograph of the building was shortlisted for the Arcaid Award, an architecture photography prize.

After featuring in a music video for Korean boyband Seventeen, the fame of the backdrop made the Hong Kong government tourist office begin heavily promoting it.

Education
Choi Hung Estate is in Primary One Admission (POA) School Net 45. Within the school net are multiple aided schools (operated independently but funded with government money); no government primary schools are in this net.

Secondary schools
Choi Hung Estate Catholic Secondary School
S.K.H. St. Benedict's School

Primary schools
CCC Kei Wa Primary School
S.K.H. Ching Shan Primary School
S.K.H. Yat Sau Primary School

Transport

Because the estate is accessible from major roads of Kowloon, the bus network is very convenient.

MTR
The Choi Hung MTR station on the Kwun Tong line, which is named after the estate, is in the north of the estate. Exits C3 and C4 are available for access to the estate.

In popular culture
The thumbnail of 'Love & Live' by Loona 1/3 Music Video on Youtube is Choi Hung Estate Badminton and Basketball Court.

See also
 List of public housing estates in Hong Kong
 Public housing in Hong Kong

References

External links

 Hong Kong Housing Authority

Buildings and structures completed in 1964
Ngau Chi Wan
Public housing estates in Hong Kong
Sa Tei Yuen